The Internet FAQ Consortium, also known as the Internet FAQ Archives, is a collection of USENET Frequently Asked Questions (FAQs) postings.

References

External links
 The Internet FAQ Archives

Usenet
FAQ